Dombyra Party — is a flash mob-like movement of Kazakh youth to popularize Kazakh national musical instruments, especially dombyra. The movement is non-political.

Dombyra Parties are usually held on weekdays in crowded alleys or at parks. They have occurred in Astana, Almaty, Shymkent and Atyrau and others. At the weekly events, attendants mainly play dombyra and sing dombyra-accompanied songs. One of the features of dombyra parties is to prove that anyone can learn to play the instrument without studying at music schools.

Invitations to Dombyra parties are sent via social networks. Video recordings are shared via video portals and social media. A Facebook group allows users to discuss issues related to organizational staff.

History 

The Dombyra party was initiated by Kazakh bloggers, using the "KerekInfo" platform in 2012. The first event took place on August 12 in Astana. Since then, Dombyra Parties have been held in almost every big city, as well as in Istanbul, London, Berlin and Porto.

References

External links 

 

Flash mob
Culture jamming techniques
Kazakhstani musical instruments
Kazakhstani culture